Salt River Township is an inactive township in Schuyler County, in the U.S. state of Missouri.

Salt River Township most likely takes its name from the North Fork Salt River.

References

Townships in Missouri
Townships in Schuyler County, Missouri